Luis Pareto González (29 August 1928 – 7 January 2022) was a Chilean politician.

Life and career 
A member of the Christian Democrat Party of Chile, Pareto served as a deputy, and in that role, he became the President of the Chamber of Deputies of Chile from 23 May 1973 until the coup d'état on 11 September of that year, and between March 2001 and March 2002. He also served as the Intendant of the Santiago Metropolitan Region during the presidency of Patricio Aylwin, the first of the Chilean transition to democracy (1990–1994). He died on 7 January 2022, at the age of 93.

References

External links 

1928 births
2022 deaths
People from Santiago
Chilean people of Ligurian descent
Chilean Roman Catholics
National Democratic Party (Chile) politicians
Christian Democratic Party (Chile) politicians
Presidents of the Chamber of Deputies of Chile
Deputies of the XLIII Legislative Period of the National Congress of Chile
Deputies of the XLIV Legislative Period of the National Congress of Chile
Deputies of the XLV Legislative Period of the National Congress of Chile
Deputies of the XLVI Legislative Period of the National Congress of Chile
Deputies of the XLVII Legislative Period of the National Congress of Chile
Deputies of the L Legislative Period of the National Congress of Chile
Intendants of Santiago Metropolitan Region
Chilean lawyers